S. Damodaran may refer to:

S. Damodaran (politician), politician from the Indian State of Tamil Nadu affiliated to All India Anna Dravida Munnetra Kazhagam
S Damodaran (social worker), social worker from Tamil Nadu, the founder of the NGO Gramalaya

See also
S. Dhamodharan, politician from Tamil Nadu affiliated to Tamil Maanila Congress (Moopanar)